Ekebergparken Sculpture Park is a sculpture park and a national heritage park close to Ekebergrestauranten with  a panoramic view of the city at Ekeberg in the southeast of the city of Oslo, Norway.

The Sculpture Park has been initiated and financed by property director and art collector Christian Ringnes (born 1954). The park is located in a wooded area of 25.5 acres, and was inaugurated 26 September 2013.

A total of 31 sculptures were installed when the opening ceremony took place in 2013, many of them with women as subjects. The park is owned by the City of Oslo and sculptures owned by the Christian Ringnes instituted foundation, C Ludens Ringnes Foundation.  It was fully established in February 2015, including accrued trails, water surface and at least 25 sculptures deployed. The capital of NOK 350 million was set aside at the time to cover purchases of  additional sculptures, up to a total of eighty, and the operation of the park for at least 50 years.

Museum 
Adjacent to the sculpture park there is also an indoor museum (open every day 11 a.m. to 4 p.m.), located in Lunds Hus, which presents the Ekeberg area's history and nature.  There is also an art and design shop that has books and design items.  Lunds hus is a white villa from 1891 and a base of the Ekebergparken Sculpture Park.

Works of art in Ekebergparken Sculpture Park 
Ekebergparken Sculpture Park consisted 2019 of the following artworks:
The Scream, 2013. Site specific performance, 2013, by Marina Abramović
Indre rom VI. Livsløpet, stainless steel, by Per Inge Bjørlo
Reflections, bronze, 2006, by Guy Buseyne
Reclining Woman, bronze, by Fernando Botero
 Ace of diamonds III, stainless steel, 2004, by Lynn Chadwick
 Sturm und Drang, painted bronze, 2014, by Jake and Dinos Chapman
Cast glances, bronze, 2002, by Tony Cragg
The Dance, stainless steel, 2013, by George Cutts

Venus Milo aux tiroirs, bronze, 1936, by Salvador Dalí
Dilemma, bronze, 2017, by Elmgreen & Dragset

Ekeberg Pavillion, glass, stone and metal, 2013, by Dan Graham
Walking Woman, bronze, 2010, by Sean Henry
Anatomy of an Angel, marble, 2008, by Damien Hirst 
Stone carving, 2013, by Jenny Holzer
Air Burial, by Roni Horn
Marilyn, stainless steel, by Richard Hudson
Levitating woman, bronze, 2012, by Matt Johnson
Deep Cream Maradona, 2016, bronze, by Sarah Lucas
Judith, bronze, 2017, by Markus Lüpertz
 Open Book, stainless steel, 2010, by Diane Maclean

Nue sans draperie, bronze, 1921, by Aristide Maillol

Konkavt ansikt, marble, 2006, by Hilde Mæhlum
Light projection, installation, 2010–13, by Tony Oursler
Venus Victrix, bronze, 1914–16, by Auguste Renoir
La grande laveuse, bronze, 1917, by Auguste Renoir
Eva, bronze, 1881, by Auguste Rodin
Cariatide tombée à l'urne, bronze, by Auguste Rodin
Fideicommisum, bronze, 2002, by Ann-Sofi Sidén
Drømmersken, marble, 1992, by Knut Steen
Still life with landscape, stainless steel, 2011–12, by Sarah Sze
Pathfinder #18700, by Fujiko Nakaya
Spectral Power. Φeλ (Talking lamppost), Location-specific work, installation, 2013, by Tony Oursler
Chloé, marble, 2019, by Jaume Plensa 
Möbius trippel by Aase Texmon Rygh
Skyspace: The Color Beneath, installation, 2010–13, by James Turrell
Ganzfeld: Double Vision, installation, 2013, by James Turrell
Mor med barn, bronze, by Per Ung
Mann og kvinne, Adorasjon, bronze, 1908, by Gustav Vigeland
Huldra, bronze, by Dyre Vaa
Traveller, bronze, by Tori Wrånes

References

External links 
 Ekebergparken Sculpture Park Website 
 Ekebergparken: Map of the park
 Ekebergparken's 1. ancient history, 2. Year 500BC - 18th century, 3.19th century - present
 Nature at Ekebergparken
 Ekebergparken at www.visitnorway.com 
 Ekebergparken at www.visitoslo.com 
 

Ekeberg
Parks in Oslo
Sculpture gardens, trails and parks in Oslo